Cîșla is a commune in Cantemir District, Moldova. It is composed of two villages, Cîșla and Șofranovca.

References

Communes of Cantemir District